The logrunners are two species of birds in the family Orthonychidae. They were previously considered conspecific, but as they differ significantly, they are now generally considered separate species. The family Orthonychidae also contains a third species, the chowchilla (Orthonyx spaldingii).

Description
Logrunners are 17–20 cm. in length. The bulky chowchilla is much larger, at 26–28 cm.
Chowchillas are dark brown above, with a black head and a blue-gray eye ring. Logrunners are patterned olive, gray, and mottled black. All males have a white throat, while females have a rufous throat and upper breast.

Distribution
Australian logrunner lives in the humid lowland forest along the eastern coast of Australia. Papuan logrunner is found in Indonesia and Papua New Guinea's tropical montane forests. Chowchillas live in the rain forests of northeastern Queensland.

Species
 New Guinea logrunner (Orthonyx novaeguineae).
 Australian logrunner (Orthonyx temminckii).
 Chowchilla (Orthonyx spaldingii)

References

 Del Hoyo, J.; Elliot, A. & Christie D. (editors). (2006). Handbook of the Birds of the World. Volume 12: Picathartes to Tits and Chickadees. Lynx Edicions. 

Orthonychidae
Bird common names